Cat Street may refer to:
 Cat Street, Tokyo
 Catte Street, Oxford, England
 Upper Lascar Row, Hong Kong
 Cat Street (manga), a Japanese manga by Yoko Kamio